The Battle of Anderson was a minor skirmish during the American Civil War, fought in Anderson County, South Carolina, on May 1, 1865. The battle was one of the final conflicts of the war, taking place three weeks after Robert E. Lee surrendered to Ulysses S. Grant at Appomattox Court House. The exact location of the battle is unknown, but it definitely took place in Anderson. Some historians believe the battle took place near the now-I-85 and the Shiloh Methodist Church in the Piedmont area. The battle is reenacted every April. By 2020, it has been re-enacted 17 times.

Battle

Prelude 

On April 27, Union General George Stoneman ordered three brigades, totaling 3,700 men, to march from Asheville down the Saluda River to Belton or Anderson, and finally to head to Augusta in search of Jefferson Davis, the only president of the Confederacy. After Stoneman gave those orders, he left to return to his headquarters in Knoxville. He left behind some units under the command of Simeon B. Brown.

Fighting 

On May 1, the Union forces arrived in Anderson County. After the Union army arrived, they looted homes and businesses from Pendleton to Anderson. They even looted and disposed of 300 bottles of wine. While in Anderson, Union soldiers killed a teenager named William McKenzie Parker after he pointed his gun at the soldiers. The Union army also hung two men: Henry Winthrop and A.P Carter.  Later that day, a group of Confederate cadets from the South Carolina Military Academy attacked the Union forces. The Confederates repulsed a small group of Union soldiers who were intending to burn down a railroad bridge on the Saluda River. Meanwhile, some Union cavalry were attacked by a group of Confederate soldiers from Pendleton. Due to the Confederate victory, a man named Daniel Brown, who was being executed by the Union army, was rescued.

Aftermath 
On May 2, the Union army publicly tortured three men, hoping that they could reveal the location of rumored Confederate gold. Also on May 2, another group of 2,050 Union soldiers arrived. However, the Union Army in Anderson was unable to capture Jefferson Davis. Davis had surrendered earlier, and was captured in Georgia on May 10.  The same unit who had begun the war on January 1, 1861,by opening fire at the USS Star of the West to prevent the ship from reinforcing and resupplying Fort Sumter in Charleston Harbor considers this to be the final action east of the Mississippi River.

References

External links 
Battle of Anderson

Anderson, South Carolina
1865 in South Carolina
Battles of the American Civil War in South Carolina
Battles of the Eastern Theater of the American Civil War
Inconclusive battles of the American Civil War
1865 in the American Civil War
May 1865 events